Twain is a census-designated place (CDP) in Plumas County, California, United States. As of the 2010 census, the CDP population was 82, down from 87 at the 2000 census.

Geography
Twain is located at  (40.018101, -121.048898).

Climate
This region experiences warm (but not hot) and dry summers, with no average monthly temperatures above 71.6 °F.  According to the Köppen Climate Classification system, Twain has a warm-summer Mediterranean climate, abbreviated "Csb" on climate maps.

Demographics

2010
At the 2010 census Twain had a population of 82. The population density was 11.4 people per square mile (4.4/km). The racial makeup of Twain was 75 (91.5%) White, 0 (0.0%) African American, 2 (2.4%) Native American, 0 (0.0%) Asian, 0 (0.0%) Pacific Islander, 2 (2.4%) from other races, and 3 (3.7%) from two or more races.  Hispanic or Latino of any race were 14 people (17.1%).

The whole population lived in households; no one lived in non-institutionalized group quarters and no one was institutionalized.

There were 40 households, 6 (15.0%) had children under the age of 18 living in them, 18 (45.0%) were opposite-sex married couples living together, 4 (10.0%) had a female householder with no husband present, 3 (7.5%) had a male householder with no wife present.  There were 4 (10.0%) unmarried opposite-sex partnerships, and 0 (0%) same-sex married couples or partnerships. 11 households (27.5%) were one person and 3 (7.5%) had someone living alone who was 65 or older. The average household size was 2.05.  There were 25 families (62.5% of households); the average family size was 2.44.

The age distribution was 10 people (12.2%) under the age of 18, 5 people (6.1%) aged 18 to 24, 6 people (7.3%) aged 25 to 44, 44 people (53.7%) aged 45 to 64, and 17 people (20.7%) who were 65 or older.  The median age was 55.3 years. For every 100 females, there were 82.2 males.  For every 100 females age 18 and over, there were 84.6 males.

There were 57 housing units at an average density of 7.9 per square mile, of the occupied units 23 (57.5%) were owner-occupied and 17 (42.5%) were rented. The homeowner vacancy rate was 4.2%; the rental vacancy rate was 0%.  43 people (52.4% of the population) lived in owner-occupied housing units and 39 people (47.6%) lived in rental housing units.

2000
At the 2000 census there were 87 people, 42 households, and 24 families in the CDP. The population density was 11.7 people per square mile (4.5/km). There were 57 housing units at an average density of 7.7 per square mile (3.0/km).  The racial makeup of the CDP was 96.55% White, 1.15% from other races, and 2.30% from two or more races. Hispanic or Latino of any race were 2.30%.

Of the 42 households 16.7% had children under the age of 18 living with them, 47.6% were married couples living together, 9.5% had a female householder with no husband present, and 40.5% were non-families. 19.0% of households were one person and 4.8% were one person aged 65 or older. The average household size was 2.07 and the average family size was 2.36.

The age distribution was 11.5% under the age of 18, 4.6% from 18 to 24, 25.3% from 25 to 44, 40.2% from 45 to 64, and 18.4% 65 or older. The median age was 50 years. For every 100 females, there were 93.3 males. For every 100 females age 18 and over, there were 92.5 males.

The median household income was $16,071 and the median family income  was $10,313. The per capita income for the CDP was $19,472. There were 70.6% of families and 72.1% of the population living below the poverty line, including no under eighteens and 100.0% of those over 64.

Politics

References

Census-designated places in Plumas County, California
Census-designated places in California